Diarsia cia is a moth of the family Noctuidae. It is found in Taiwan.

The wingspan is 36–39 mm.

References

Moths described in 1919
Diarsia